Eeva Kalli (born 10 January 1981 in Kiukainen) is a Finnish politician currently serving in the Parliament of Finland for the Centre Party at the Satakunta constituency.

References

1981 births
Living people
People from Eura
Centre Party (Finland) politicians
Members of the Parliament of Finland (2019–23)
21st-century Finnish women politicians
Women members of the Parliament of Finland